The Berwick Bandits are a British speedway club, based in Berwick-upon-Tweed. They currently compete in the SGB Championship, racing at Shielfield Park, with home matches usually taking place on Saturday evenings. They also run a second team in the National Development League, known as the Berwick Bullets.

History

1968–1981
Berwick have been operational in consecutive seasons from 1968 (as founder members of British League Division Two) through to the present day. From 1968 to 1980 they competed in division 2, either in the British League Division 2, or under the new name of the National League (NL). The team won their first honour during the 1980 National League season after winning the Division 2 Knockout Cup. In 1980, Berwick left Shielfield Park after a disagreement with the landlords Berwick Rangers FC. They raced their remaining fixtures as 'Nomads' including racing the second leg of the KO cup final at Brough Park Newcastle. In 1981 the Bandits were still homeless and carried on riding home fixtures at Barrow, Workington and Glasgow before being forced to quit NL racing after a protest from Edinburgh boss Mike Parker. The Bandits were, however, allowed to defend their KO Cup, reaching the final against Edinburgh, which the Monarchs won. Wayne Brown was national league riders champion in 1980.

1982–1995
Between 1982 and 1995, Berwick Bandits were based at the Berrington Lough track near Ancroft, Northumberland. The last meeting staged at Berrington Lough was the Academy League KO Cup Final 1st Leg v Stoke Potters on the 21st of October 1995; the final race was won by Glyn Taylor after Kevin Little's bike packed up whilst leading. It was during this period that the club experienced their most success. They won their second Division 2 knockout Cup in 1989 and the 1994 British League Division Three title before completing the league and cup double during the 1995 Academy League season. During the 1991 British League season (the team's only top flight season, whilst owned by Entrepreneur Terry Lindon) they won the Gold Cup. Steve McDerrmott was also national league riders champion in 1983.

1996–present
On 9 July 1995, bikes returned to Shielfield Park for the first time in 15 years so that council officials could carry out noise tests, and on 17 August 1996, the Bandits returned to Shielfield Park for their second spell at the Tweedmouth track. Berwick won the Premier League Four-Team Championship in 2002. In 2005, the team finished 2nd in the Premier League and reached the semi-finals of the Knockout Cup and Young Shield. In 2008, the Bandits made the final of the Young Shield, losing out to Workington Comets in what turned out to be promoter Peter Waite's last meeting in charge. 

In 2009, a new shortlived promotion came in, spearheaded by longtime supporter and North Berwick butcher John Anderson, with Cornhill shopkeeper Linda Waite (no relation to Peter) joining John and his sons. On 26 July 2010, the Berwick promotion announced that there had been a change in ownership. Lynda Waite stepped down but remained a sponsor of the 2010 Bordernapolis event. After her departure, John Anderson announced the new investor was George Hepburn, owner of Berwick building contractor George Hepburn and Son Ltd., a long-term supporter of the Bandits and sponsor of rider Lee Complin. Following the announcement of George Hepburn's investment, it was then announced that Dave Peet (team manager, late-2008 to mid-2010) had departed from the club and had been replaced by the track curator and staff manager Ian Rae. Rae's association with speedway in Berwick-upon-Tweed extended back to his role as stadium manager at their Berrington Lough Stadium, followed by several years – up until 2001 – as team manager.

Berwick won the Premier League Four-Team Championship for a second time in 2012. In 2015, the Bandits owner John Anderson announced mid-season, amid a run of poor results and dwindling attendances, that it was time for new blood to come aboard, either in the form of a takeover, or by an input of new ideas and capital investment. The other option available was the closure of the club and the liquidation of the club's assets. After some months of apparent inactivity and inertia, three new associate directors came aboard, and the Bandits declared their intention to continue in advance of the Speedway Promoters Annual Meeting. The Associate Directors were a trio of Berwick-based businessmen, with successful enterprises and connections in the Berwick community, something that had been identified as a weakness in the previous management structure. The trio consisted of Michael Mullan of Castle Blinds, Dennis Hush of Ideal Carpets, and property investor Darren Amers.

In August 2016 it was announced that the trio of Hush, Mullan and Amers had resigned their positions citing the incumbent owner's reluctance to change. On 4 September 2016, Berwick Speedway issued a statement from Bandits promoter and owner John Anderson, on behalf of his fellow directors Ryan Anderson and George Hepburn, that the 2016 season was to be their last in charge and the club was up for sale as a going concern and they were ready to talk to interested parties. On 21 October 2016, the club announced it had new owners: 2016 team manager Scott Courtney, his younger Brother Jamie Courtney and 1992 World Champion Gary Havelock. In January 2018, it was revealed in Companies House returns that Havelock had left the club, and was no longer a director, and on 5 November 2018, a statement was issued saying that Scott and Jamie Courtney were putting the club up for sale. However, on 19 November 2018, Jamie Courtney announced the club would run in 2019. Scott Courtney took a 'back-seat role' in the club, leaving his brother Jamie, along with new co-promoters Gary Flint and Steven Dews. Dennis McCleary, who was co-promoter with Scott Courtney, stepped down from his role for the 2019 season.

In 2019, Berwick narrowly missed out on a play-off spot for the second season running.

Season Summary (Bandits)

Season Summary (Development)

Berwick Bullets formerly Berwick Border Raiders are the development side to the Bandits. For the 2021 National League season, the team was Leon Flint and Kyle Bickley (the two riders named as the reserves for the main team in 2021) with the remaining five riders being: Greg Blair, Ben Rathbone, Ryan MacDonald, Kieran Douglas, and Mason Watson.

Riders previous seasons

2006 team

2007 team

Also rode

2008 team

Also Rode:

2009 team

Also rode

2010 team

Also Rode

2011 team

Also Rode

2012 team

Also rode

2013 team

Also rode

2014 team

Also rode

2015 team

Also rode

2016 team

also rode 

2019 team

 Aaron Summers
 Thomas H. Jonasson
 Jye Etheridge
 Kevin Doolan
 Dany Gappmaier
 Coty Garcia
 Leon Flint

2021 team

Also Rode

2022 team

 (C)

Also Rode

References

Speedway Premier League teams
SGB Championship teams
Berwick-upon-Tweed
Sport in Northumberland